Bontade is a surname. People with this surname include:

 Francesco Paolo Bontade (1914–1974), member of the Sicilian Mafia
 Giovanni Bontade (1946–1988), member of the Sicilian Mafia
 Margherita Bontade (1900–1992), Italian politician
 Stefano Bontade (1939–1981), member of the Sicilian Mafia

Surnames of Italian origin